Friedrich Gollwitzer (27 April 1889 – 25 March 1977) was a general in the Wehrmacht of Nazi Germany who commanded the LIII Army Corps. He was a recipient of the Knight's Cross of the Iron Cross.

With the outbreak of the First World War, Gollwitzer was appointed adjutant of the replacement battalion. In the same position he joined the 2nd Reserve Engineer Battalion in mid-January 1915 and was promoted to lieutenant on 1 June 1915. Gollwitzer ended the war as a captain, awarded both classes of the Iron Cross and the Military Merit Order.

Gollwitzer surrendered to the Soviet troops in June 1944 during the Vitebsk–Orsha Offensive. Convicted as a war criminal in the Soviet Union, he was held October 1955. In West Germany, Gollwitzer was investigated for war crimes allegedly committed under his command during the 1939 invasion of Poland.

Allegations of war crimes 
In 1964 the public prosecutor's office in Amberg (West Germany) started an inquiry against Gollwitzer over his alleged involvement in war crimes. In 1968 Central Office of the State Justice Administrations for the Investigation of National Socialist Crimes in Ludwigsburg received a letter from Ferdinand D. – a Wehrmacht veteran – who accused Gollwitzer of committing several atrocities during the Invasion of Poland in 1939. In his letter the veteran stated that: "activities of 41st Infantry Regiment under the command of Colonel Gollwitzer (...) were nothing less than genocide. Despite the fact that in Poland there were no partisans at that time almost no  village from Kalisz to Warsaw had survived because Gollwitzer sparked an obsession with the partisans in his soldiers' minds". In particular, Gollwitzer was accused of ordering the execution of 18 Poles in a village Torzeniec which was blamed for the death of three German soldiers (in fact the soldiers were victims of friendly fire). However, the prosecutor's office in Amberg decided to drop the investigation against Gollwitzer.

Awards

 Knight's Cross of the Iron Cross on 8 February 1943 as Generalleutnant and commander of 88. Infanterie-Division

References

Citations

Bibliography

1889 births
1977 deaths
German Army generals of World War II
Generals of Infantry (Wehrmacht)
German Army personnel of World War I
German prisoners of war in World War II held by the Soviet Union
Military personnel from Bavaria
People from the Kingdom of Bavaria
People from Kitzingen (district)
Recipients of the clasp to the Iron Cross, 1st class
Recipients of the Gold German Cross
Recipients of the Knight's Cross of the Iron Cross
Reichswehr personnel